The Picota Province is one of ten provinces of the San Martín Region in northern Peru.

Political division
The province is divided into ten districts.

 Buenos Aires (Buenos Aires)
 Caspisapa (Caspisapa)
 Picota (Picota)
 Pilluana (Pilluana)
 Pucacaca (Pucacaca)
 San Cristóbal (Puerto Rico)
 San Hilarion (San Cristóbal de Sisa)
 Shamboyacu (Shamboyacu)
 Tingo de Ponasa (Tingo de Ponasa)
 Tres Unidos (Tres Unidos)

Provinces of the San Martín Region